In traditionalist philosophy, resacralization of knowledge is the reverse of the process of secularization of knowledge. The central premise is that knowledge is intimately connected to its supposed divine source—God or the Ultimate Reality—which has been severed in modern times. The process of resacralization of knowledge seeks to reinstate the role of intellect—the divine faculty believed to exist in every human being—above and beyond that of reason, as well as to revive the role of traditional metaphysics  in acquiring knowledge—especially knowledge of God—by drawing on sacred traditions and sacred science that uphold divine revelations and the spiritual or gnostic teachings of all revealed religions. Iranian philosopher Seyyed Hossein Nasr elaborated on the process of resacralization of knowledge in his book Knowledge and the Sacred, which was presented as Gifford Lectures in 1981.

Origin
The Oxford Encyclopedia of the Modern Islamic World states that Nasr's 1981 Gifford Lectures, which were published under the title Knowledge and the Sacred, reflect "his hope of reviving what he calls the sacred quality of knowledge as opposed to secularized reason". Nasr argues in his Gifford Lectures that the Western intellectual tradition "is in need of  a resacralization of knowledge". He contends that Islamic tradition and the "living traditions of the Orient" can aid in revitalizing the Western intellectual tradition because knowledge and the sacred have never been separated in the Orient.

Background

Nasr and other Traditionalists believe that modernity is an "anomaly" in world history, "a renewed jahilliya" or "an Age of Ignorance," because forgetfulness of the Sacred only occupies the forefront of modern worldviews, despite the fact that such forgetfulness has always been a characteristic of human existence. In the absence of a unifying theological framework, humanity has forgotten the divine roots of "both outer and human nature" and has fallen out of touch with divinity in hitherto unheard-of ways. Nasr emphasizes the "symbolic element of reality" which he believes "has been lost under the literalist reign of modern science". In reference to the Sufi view of the "veil of perception" which is said to conceal the Ultimate Reality, Nasr contends that knowledge of Self and the physical world of modernity is superficial, resulting in "an externalized image away from the cosmic center" because modern civilization confuses the "quantitative accumulation of information" with "qualitative penetration" into the deeper dimensions of reality. Nasr accuses modern sciences of eroding the theological and metaphysical basis of knowledge by generating "the most anthropocentric form of knowledge conceivable", which relies solely on human reason and empirical data to determine the validity of all knowledge. All human sciences, for Nasr, deny the possibility of other orders of reality and, as a result, exclude all other forms of knowing, dismissing the idea that the world's reality extends beyond physical dimensions.

Predecessors
According to Liu Shu-hsien, Nasr claims that when the secularization process appeared to be approaching its natural conclusion in favor of completely removing the influence of the sacred from all areas of human existence and thought, as indicated by Nietzsche's declaration: God is dead; some modern individuals sought to reclaim the sacred. In contrast to the mechanical and rationalistic views of the cosmos and man of individuals such as Bacon, Newton, and Locke, poets such as Goethe, Blake, and Emerson sought to return to a more holistic vision of man and nature. Nasr credits individuals such as  A. H. Anquetil Duperron, J. Hammer-Purgstall, and Sir William Jones, as well as Thomas Taylor, Walt Whitman, and the New England Transcendentalists, among others, for paving the way toward the rediscovery of the sacred in the West. However, Nasr claims that they were unable to restore tradition in the West or revive the scientia sacra, which is at the center of all sacred traditions. According to Nasr, the sapiental perspective in the West had become too weak due to the lack of "authentic contact" with the Oriental traditions, which had retained their basic teachings intact in their doctrinal and operational dimensions. For Nasr, it was up to the Orient to revive sapiential tradition in the West through individuals influenced by its light. Nasr mentions Rene Guenon, Ananda K. Coomaraswamy, and Frithjof Schuon among others as having sought to restore the sapiential dimension in the West.

Frameworks

Reversal of rationalization
According to Steve Yim, resacralization of knowledge for Nasr entails restoring knowledge to its original state prior to the process of secularization. He describes the process of resacralization of knowledge as the process of reviving spiritual and transcendent dimensions of knowledge, which have their origins in divine revelations. Although Nasr believes that Islam is the authentic religion that contains the absolute truth, he also believes in the reality of other "genuine revelations" outside of Islam. Nasr contends, in the spirit of other traditionalist thinkers, that every religious tradition contains the eternal truth of God. All religions are united in the fact that they all have their origins in the Absolute, which is both truth and reality and the source of all revelations and truth. According to this perspective, knowledge that is not accompanied with a sense of the divine cannot be regarded as true knowledge.

In opposition to supposed reductionist tendencies of modern human sciences, Nasr contends that the sapiential tradition of world religions provides a comprehensive account of the hierarchy of knowledge that correlates to different orders of reality. While the natural and social sciences are said to confine legitimate knowledge to a rationalist interpretation of the physical realm, which has allegedly given rise to an analytical and compartmentalized view of the universe, a holistic perspective of knowledge is believed to be founded on intellect and reason,  i. e., on both intuition and reason. For Nasr, "knowledge extends in hierarchy from an empirical and rational mode of knowing to the highest form of knowledge" which he terms as the "unitive knowledge" or al-ma'rifah. Nasr emphasizes over and again that the knowledge to which the Quran alludes to is placed inside a sacred framework, just as previous Islamic sciences were constrained by a metaphysical framework of the harmony and complete order of the cosmos. Knowledge thus must be reconstructed in terms of both a true metaphysics of God's essence and a science of the revealed cosmic order, which points to a higher order of reality. The process of resacralization necessitates the restoration of the place of the intellect above and beyond the place of reason, in order for mankind to reestablish connection with God, and the relative with the Absolute. Since the intellect is capable of knowing the Absolute, it must serve as the foundation for a resacralized paradigm of knowledge. According to Nasr, "the ground of the intellect is the Divine and so is its ultimate goal". It is a "divine spark" within humans, which emanates from the "Divine Light".

Zaidi presents Nasr's idea of resacralisation of knowledge as the polar opposite of Weber's Entzauberungprozess. He quotes Nasr as saying that "Certainly my goal is to move in the opposite direction than what Max Weber called the Entzauberungprozess". Nasr's appeal to intuition as the foundation of knowledge stems from his belief that intuitive or sapiential knowledge fosters an intimate relationship between the knower, the act of knowing, and the object to be known. Nasr therefore broadens the idea of tawhid from its narrow orthodox view of God's unity to the Unity of Being. The concept of tawhid here has implications on both the ontological and epistemological levels, since it eliminates the subject-object duality that lies at the heart of the post-Enlightenment paradigm of thought. According to Nasr, rationality without intuition along with the idea of the knowing subject separated from the known object cause us to become preoccupied with the particular, relative, and ephemeral or the Universal, Absolute, and Eternal, without really being able to correlate the two. According to Nasr, the process of knowledge reconstruction must call into question not just the ontological status of physical reality, but also the epistemological validity of the knowledge that purports to explain that reality. Nasr's reconstruction thus seeks to utilise metaphysics as a "necessary reversal" of modernity's rationalization process.

Revival of Tradition

According Jane I. Smith, Nasr seeks to restore the sacred quality of knowledge by reversing the process by which "secularized reason has been brought to bear on sacred traditions." For Nasr, the resuscitation of Tradition is vital to resacralizing knowledge, because "a de-traditionalized world cannot manifest the sacred", nor can modern science, or the modern world in general, transcend its inherent flaws, and because "The
rediscovery of the sacred is ultimately and inextricably related to the revival of tradition". For Nasr and other traditionalists, Tradition centers on the Divine or the Sacred. It specifically refers to the "transmission of sapiential knowledge found in the spiritual, esoteric, or Gnostic traditions in each of the World Religions, a knowledge that recognizes the sacred and divine origin of the cosmos". 
 The Dictionary of Literary Biography also describes Nasr's response to the issue of desacralization of knowledge as a return to tradition, which entails "truths or principles of a divine origin revealed or unveiled to mankind and, in fact, a whole cosmic sector through various figures envisaged as messengers, prophets, avataras, the Logos or other transmitting agencies" as well as their implications in various domains of human life and thought. Ernest Wolf-Gazo asserts that "In Nasr's universe of discourse the concepts of revelation, unity, origin, source, tradition, perennial wisdom, sophia, and intellectual intuition of God are interrelated like a cobweb." He views the recovery or rediscovery of man's intellect, which is "the fundamental insight of humankind," as the ultimate goal of "the reenchantment project." This intellect is "the instrument of knowledge within man" and "is endowed with the possibility of knowing the Absolute." According to Gai Eaton, instead of theoretic knowledge, Nasr places his emphasis on "realized" knowledge. For Nasr, "The unknown is not out there, beyond the present boundary of knowledge, but at the Center of man's being here and now where it has always been". The only reason humans are unaware of it is because they have forgotten that it exists. Nasr compares such knowledge with a sun that keeps shining despite the fact that humans can no longer see its light due of their blindness. This knowledge can only be attained through "the acquisition of spiritual virtues, which is the manner in which man participates in that truth which is itself suprahuman". Such realized knowledge is never divorced or disconnected from revelation, religion, tradition and orthodoxy.

Resacralization of science
According to Daiwie Fu, Nasr's call for the resacralization of science is "gnosis-oriented". Scholars such as Seyyed Hossein Nasr, Alparslan Açkgenç, and Osman Bakar maintain that religion and science cannot be reconciled without changing the philosophical foundations of modern science because modern science is essentially secular and is responsible for desacralizing the universe. Nasr, along with members of the Traditionalist School such as Frithjof Schuon, René Guénon, and Titus Burckhardt, contends that the premodern and modern sciences differ in their conceptions of nature, methods, cosmological presuppositions, epistemological perspective, and the parametric structure used to process the "facts" discovered through observation and experimentation. According to Kathleen Raine, Nasr does not oppose "science itself, as such and within its own field", but rather scientism, which Gai Eaton defines "as the whole body of thought and speculation constructed upon the working theories whereby scientists attempt to coordinate their observations and to explain rationally a phenomenal world to which they do not possess the key".

Revival of the sacred view of sciences

In order to overcome the perceived constraints of modern science, Traditionalists argue for the resuscitation of "the traditional sacred outlook of sciences", without subscribing to the metaphysical principles of modern science. According to Nasr, the primary distinction between traditional science and modern science is that, in the former, the profane and purely human remain constantly marginal and the sacred is central, whereas, in the latter, the profane has taken center stage.  For this reason, despite the fact that certain intuitions and discoveries made possible by modern science reveal the Divine Origin of the natural world, it has been so marginalized that it is hardly acknowledged. Thus, traditionalists propose that the modern worldview be deconstructed by altering the foundational assumptions about the nature of reality, which are believed to be governed by the prevailing "dualist-mechanistic-anthropocentric paradigm". In Nasr's view, science is hierarchical, or subservient to a higher order. According to this perspective, modern science is deficient because it only addresses some aspects of reality while dismissing others. Traditional sciences, on the other hand, maintain the "hierarchy of realities, the primacy of the spiritual over the material, the sacred character of the cosmos, and the unity of knowledge and interrelatedness of beings." Epistemologically, such science is based on revelation, intellect, and reason.

Nasr thus seeks to reinstate "the traditional hierarchy of metaphysics over physics". He condemns any attempt to combine science and religion in such a way that religion conforms to modern scientific theories. Traditional religion, in his opinion, must not be influenced by modern science; rather, modern science should be placed in its appropriate perspective and, if required, corrected by traditional metaphysics. Nasr believes that the only way to counteract scientism, which he predicts will gain strength as scientific applications in the form of technology continue to undermine the sanctity of the human person while also hastening ecological degradation of the planet, is through sacred science, which upholds the hierarchy of knowledge and sapiential teachings of the world religions.

Effects
The resacralization of knowledge is said to have the potential to reconnect man with the divine. Because, according to Nasr, the intellective or intuitive perception of higher orders of reality is ultimately what permits Man to know God. According to Nasr, the rediscovery of the sacred dimension of knowledge would cast fresh light on Greek wisdom, the wisdom of Plato, Plotinus, and other Graeco-Alexandrian sages as well as teachings such as Hermeticism, not as mere "human philosophy" but as sacred teachings of divine inspiration comparable to Hindu darśanas rather than modern philosophical schools of today. In this regard, Nasr points to "the belief of Muslim philosophers that the Greek philosophers had learned their doctrines from the prophets", particularly Solomon, and that "philosophy derives from the niche of prophecy". Nasr argues that this claim, while historically unverifiable, embodies a fundamental truth, namely the connection of their philosophical wisdom to the sacred and its foundation in revelation, even though this revelation is distinct from that of Abrahamic religions.

Reception
According to Nidhal Guessoum, the concepts of God's "robust unity" and the function of intuitive knowledge bring nothing new to our understanding of scientific processes. He believes that deconstructing science in order to resacralize it is unnecessary because the ultimate objective is to reconcile "religious tradition with rational and scientific modernity." Likewise, Mehdi Golshani claims that Nasr's metaphysical objections are unnecessary since "science and metaphysics are complementary rather than contradictory." Sacralization initiatives, according to Syed Farid Alatas, do not provide alternatives to modernist discourse. However, Ernest Wolf-Gazo sees a possibility of reconciling Nasr's philosophy with the Western tradition, if positive worldviews in this regard can be reconstructed, taking into account the philosophies of figures such as Plato, Plotinus, Meister Eckhart, Cusanas, Spinoza, Goethe and German romantics such as Novalis, Schlegel, Schelling and Steffen. Then it might become possible to see that intellectual intuition of God is quite legitimate even within the Western tradition. For Wolf-Gazo, the reconstruction must be carried out in such a way that the Neo-Platonic tradition and the nominalists of late medieval philosophy, from Ockham to the analytic schools, from Newton to Whitehead, may be reconciled.

Other scholarly trends

Maslow's resacralization
According to the American psychologist Abraham Maslow (1966), the desacralization of science has produced "the type of science that lacks emotion, joy, wonder, awe, and rapture." Thus, he embraced the concept of a scientific ethos that is founded on "a humanistic, holistic approach that is not value free and that has scientists who care about the people and topics they investigate." He encouraged scientists to reintroduce values, creativity, emotion, and ritual to their work. In order to accomplish this, science needs to be resacralized, which entails infusing it with ceremony, fervor, and human values.

Wexler's resacralization of research
The educational sociologist Philip Wexler argues that the social sciences and education should no longer take secularization for granted because we have now reached a post-secular era that that demands a "religious turn" and a "re-sacralization of research". In order to accomplish this, scholars may need to reexamine early sociological works by Weber, Durkheim, Eliade, and others not only for their relevance but also for their shortcomings in contemporary analysis. Resacralization, in this view, entails more than simply returning to religion; rather, it requires a reconstruction of social life that recognizes the continued significance of religion and the potential value of looking at it from a religious perspective.

See also
 Pontifical and Promethean man

References

Sources

Further reading
 
 
 
 
 

Philosophy of religion
Philosophy of science
Traditionalist School
Epistemology of religion
Esotericism
Seyyed Hossein Nasr